Gerard Imutan Salonga (born October 11, 1973) is a Filipino musical conductor, composer, and arranger. From 2012 to 2020, he was the music director of the ABS-CBN Philharmonic Orchestra, assistant conductor of the Hong Kong Philharmonic Orchestra from 2016 to 2018, and from 2019 to the present the resident conductor of the Malaysian Philharmonic Orchestra.

Early life and education
Gerard Imutan Salonga was born on October 11, 1973 in Manila, Philippines to Feliciano Genuino Salonga, a naval rear admiral and shipping company owner, and María Ligaya Alcantara, née Imutan of Pulupandan, Negros Occidental. His older sister is singer, actress, columnist, and producer Lea Salonga. Salonga began his musical education, taking piano lessons, at the age of 5. He joined his sister Lea in singing duets in her first album, Small Voice, as well as taking part in the 8th Metro Manila Popular Music Festival as interpreters for the song entry "Musika, Lata, Sipol at La La La" by Tess Concepcion in 1985, which won second place.

Salonga completed his Bachelor of Arts degree at the Ateneo de Manila University in 1994, and briefly studied music theory with Filipino composer Ryan Cayabyab. He subsequently went to the United States to pursue arranging studies at the Berklee College of Music in Boston, Massachusetts, where he graduated summa cum laude and received Berklee's Contemporary Writing and Production Achievement Award.

Career
Salonga worked briefly at Sony Pictures as an orchestrator and music copyist before returning to the Philippines in 1999. Upon his return, he embarked on carving his own niche in the local musical landscape. He initially guest-conducted and arranged music for the Philippine Philharmonic Orchestra and Manila Philharmonic Orchestra. By 2005, he had garnered his third consecutive Aliw Award for Best Musical Director. He later won his fourth in 2008.

Among his stints as musical director and orchestral conductor, foremost of which are his projects with his sister Lea, Gerard Salonga arranges and conducts for Filipino OPM stars such as Lani Misalucha, Martin Nievera, Regine Velasquez, and hosts of others. He was also the musical director of Carmel House, a film scoring and post-production facility coupled with a recording studio in the suburb of Alabang, outskirt of Manila. In 2005, when it was then known as the Global Content Center, he formed the Global Studio Orchestra (later known as FILharmoniKA), as its in-house orchestra for the facility.

In 2004 and 2005, he arranged and produced compelling station IDs for The Filipino Channel, both of which won the Promax World Silver Award in New York City ("Best Use of Music/Post Score with or without lyrics"). In 2006, he scored the musical soundtrack for the supernatural horror-thriller film, Ang Pamana, which had its world premiere at the Louis Vuitton Hawaii International Film Festival.

In 2006, together with FILharmoniKA, Salonga embarked on a series albums of titled Musika Natin [Our Music], highlighting works by great Filipino composers, some of which have been forgotten and some never performed. Recent releases featured compositions by the teacher-composer Lucio San Pedro, jazz maestro Angel Peña, and martial bandleader, Col. Antonio Buenaventura. Salonga also collaborated in the contemporary album Eastern Skies with jazz guitarist Johnny Alegre. A fifth album release, Kumpas, featured orchestral renditions of anthems by guest Pinoy Rock icons Ely Buendia, Sampaguita, Noel Cabangon, and Wally Gonzales. The latter anthology aspired to capture the awareness of a young Filipino listening audience to the possibilities of orchestration as a commercial platform in OPM.

In 2012, Salonga began his work as the music director of the ABS-CBN Philharmonic Orchestra, a professional orchestra in Manila maintained by Philippine media conglomerate ABS-CBN Corporation.

Salonga has conducted the Hong Kong Philharmonic Orchestra, Malaysian Philharmonic Orchestra, The Shanghai Opera House Orchestra and Chorus, The Evergreen Symphony Orchestra in Taiwan, as well as the Bangkok Symphony and Philippine Philharmonic Orchestras. His orchestral arrangements have been performed by the New York Pops, Indianapolis Symphony, Winnipeg, Pittsburgh, and Baltimore Symphony Orchestras.

For the 2016-17 season, Salonga was appointed by Maestro Jaap van Zweden to be one of the assistant conductors of the Hong Kong Philharmonic Orchestra.

Personal life
Salonga is married to violinist Divina Francisco. Together, they have two children; a son and a daughter. They reside in the Philippines.

Awards
Salonga has won the Aliw Award for Best Musical Director four times, and was inducted into the Aliw Hall of Fame in 2009. He has also won the Awit Award for Best Arrangement (recording industry award), and is twice a winner of the Philstage Gawad Buhay (Philippine musical theater) award for his work as musical director of the Manila stagings of West Side Story (Stages) and Sweeney Todd: The Demon Barber of Fleet Street (Repertory Philippines).

In 2011, Salonga was awarded The Outstanding Young Men award, the highest civilian award given by the President of the Philippines to Filipino achievers under the age of 40.

References

External links 

 Gerard Salonga at IMDb

1973 births
21st-century conductors (music)
Ateneo de Manila University alumni
Berklee College of Music alumni
Filipino conductors (music)
Filipino film score composers
Filipino male musical theatre actors
Kapampangan people
Living people
Male film score composers
Musicians from Pampanga
People from Angeles City
People from Manila